World Crisis (Spanish:Crisis mundial) is a 1934 Spanish romantic comedy film directed by Benito Perojo and starring Antoñita Colomé, Miguel Ligero and Ricardo Nunez. The film is set mostly in a Swiss luxury hotel in the wake of the Wall Street Crash. It was a box office success, but is now considered a lost film.

Cast
 Antoñita Colomé as Mery 
 Miguel Ligero as Pololo  
 Ricardo Núñez as Julio Lonaty 
 José María Linares-Rivas as Herbert Parker  
 Alfonso Tudela as Ferdinando Martini Martinelli  
 Laly Cadierno as Vampiresa  
 Carlos del Pozo as Gerente del hotel  
 Blanca Pozas
 Nicolás D. Perchicot
 Pedro Chicote as Barman  
 Francisco Zabala
 Fernando Freyre de Andrade 
 Ricardo Muñoz
 Pastora Peña
 Luchy Soto

References

Bibliography
 Bentley, Bernard. A Companion to Spanish Cinema. Boydell & Brewer 2008.

External links 

1934 films
Spanish romantic comedy films
1934 romantic comedy films
1930s Spanish-language films
Films directed by Benito Perojo
Films set in Switzerland
Spanish black-and-white films